Adriena Šimotová (1926–2014) was a prominent Czech artist. Known for her work with paper and fabric, she held numerous exhibitions in the Czech Republic and abroad during her lifetime including a retrospective organized by the National Gallery in Prague in 2001.

Biography 
Šimotová graduated from the Academy of Arts, Architecture and Design in Prague. Her early work of the 1960s was exhibited at venues including the Václav Špála Gallery and the Sao Paulo biennial. She was a founding member of the Czech art group UB 12, along with Václav Boštík, Stanislav Kolíbal, and others. After her husband's death in 1972, she shifted her artistic focus away from painting and began to use fabrics and sculptural installations. Due to the Czech Republic's political circumstances in the 1970s and 1980s, much of Šimotová's work at the time was shown on an unofficial basis or subject to censorship. 

Šimotová received the French honor the Ordre des Arts et des Lettres in 1991 and the Czech Medal of Merit in 1997. In 2000, she received the Herder Prize. Today, several of her works are held in the permanent collection of the Centre Georges Pompidou. She received an honorary doctorate from the Academy of Arts, Architecture and Design in Prague in 2007.

Šimotová died in 2014 at the age of 87.

Collections 
National Gallery in Prague
Galerie Rudolfinum
Museum Kampa
Centre Georges Pompidou

References

External links 

 Profile at Galerie U Betlémské
 Images from the series A Touch of Colour – The Assumption
 Short documentary featuring Šimotová - in Czech

20th-century Czech painters
Czech women artists
21st-century Czech painters
20th-century Czech printmakers
20th-century printmakers
21st-century printmakers
Women graphic designers
1926 births
2014 deaths
Academy of Arts, Architecture and Design in Prague alumni